The National Intelligence Service ( or ) was an intelligence agency of the Government of Peru that existed from 1960 to 2000.

During the administration of Alberto Fujimori, the agency's power expanded, and its de facto chief, Vladimiro Montesinos, used the agency for political purposes. Under pressure from the Organization of American States, Fujimori disbanded the agency in 2000.

References

Further reading 

Defunct intelligence agencies
Government agencies of Peru
Fujimorism